The 1981 ATP Championship, also known as the Cincinnati Open, was a men's tennis tournament played on outdoor hard courts at the Lindner Family Tennis Center in Mason, Ohio in the United States that was part of the 1981 Volvo Grand Prix. It was the 80th edition of the tournament and was held from August 17 through August 23, 1981. First-seeded John McEnroe won the singles title.

Finals

Singles
 John McEnroe defeated  Chris Lewis 6–3, 6–4
 It was McEnroe's 8th singles title of the year and the 32nd of his career.

Doubles
 John McEnroe /  Ferdi Taygan defeated  Bob Lutz /  Stan Smith 7–6, 6–3

References

External links
 
 ATP tournament profile
 ITF tournament edition details

Cincinnati Open
Cincinnati Masters
1981 in American tennis
Cincin